William Burke Kirwan (c.1814–1880?) was a minor Irish painter best known for the murder of his wife, Sarah Maria Louisa Kirwan. The resulting trial was one of the most notorious in Victorian Ireland.

Early life
William Bourke Kirwan was born in Dublin in 1814 into an artistic family. He studied art under the portrait painter Richard Downes Bowyer, and exhibited various pieces of art at the Royal Hibernian Academy in the 1830s and 1840s. He later worked as an engraver, picture cleaner, and anatomical draughtsman.

He married Sarah Maria Louisa Crowe (1824-1852), and they resided together on Merrion Street in Dublin. They had no children.

Murder and Aftermath
The couple went on an outing to the small island of Ireland's Eye, off the coast of Dublin, on September 6, 1852. Kirwan claimed not to be able to find his wife after she had swum while he sketched. Her body was later found on a rock on the island, covered in blood.

While at first it was believed that she had died in an accidental drowning, a later exhumation and autopsy showed signs of manual asphyxiation. Kirwan's subsequent arrest and trial caused a media sensation across the United Kingdom. The trial, which took place in Dublin's Green Street Courthouse in December 1852, attracted large crowds. Kirwan’s defence was headed by the noted barrister and MP Isaac Butt. Kirwan had long maintained a separate home in Sandymount with his mistress, Maria Teresa Kenny and their eight children, which was presented as a motive for him to murder his wife.

Kirwan was found guilty and sentenced to death, but this was commuted to life imprisonment and transportation after appeals by reputable citizens, including ten doctors who stated that his wife's death was consistent with drowning.

He was sent to the convict establishment labouring in the construction of the Royal Naval Dockyard on the island of Ireland in the Imperial fortress colony of Bermuda, where many other Irish convicts, including nationalist journalist and politician John Mitchel, had been sent before him (convicts were accommodated on prison hulks at Ireland Island until the construction of barracks for them on the adjacent Boaz Island in the 1840s). Ferdinand Whittingham, an army officer serving in the Bermuda Garrison, recorded Kirwan's presence in Bermuda in Chapter XII of his 1857 book BERMUDA; A COLONY, A FORTRESS AND A PRISON; OR, Eighteen Months in the Somers Islands:

Kirwan was freed in 1879, and may have emigrated to the United States. The site of Sarah Maria Louisa Kirwan's murder became a popular site for tourism in the mid-nineteenth century.

References

1814 births
1880 deaths
Year of birth uncertain
Year of death uncertain
19th-century Irish painters
Irish male painters
Irish people convicted of murder
Place of death missing
19th-century Irish male artists